The Kalunga line is a watery boundary between the world of the living and the dead in religious traditions of the Congo region. The word Kalunga is Kikongo for "threshold between worlds". The Kalunga line is often associated with bodies of water, with the Atlantic Ocean being prominent. They believed the soul after death traveled the path of the sun as it set in the west. The enslaved believed they were being taken to the land of the dead, never to return. Thus the Kalunga line became known as a line under the Atlantic Ocean where the living became the dead and the only way back to life was to recross the line. Some religions today still make reference to the Kalunga Line believing that the soul of an African-American travels back to Africa upon death and re-enters the world of the spiritually living although the body has passed on.

Kalunga was considered like a goddess or more commonly a god; the guardian of the border between the world of living and dead, who was the Atlantic sea. He was welcoming dead in Kalunga, the land of death, under the sea. Kalunga was also one of the names of Nzambi a Mpungu, the high creator. Kalunga in ngangela means God and if they say mukalunga they are referring to the sea.

References

Kongo culture
Water and religion